The Forum for the Cooperation of Trade Unions (SZEF) is a national trade union center in Hungary. With a membership of 274,000 the SZEF represents mainly white collar workers in education, social services and health care, cultural institutes and government agencies.

The SZEF is affiliated with the European Trade Union Confederation

References

External links
Official site

European Trade Union Confederation
National trade union centers of Hungary
Trade unions established in 1990